The Gilded Hawk is an album by saxophonist Coleman Hawkins with an orchestra arranged and conducted by Glenn Osser which was recorded in late 1956 and early 1957 and released on the Capitol label.

Reception 

Scott Yanow of AllMusic states, "this LP finds the great tenor being weighed down by Glenn Osser's muzaky arrangements for the strings. Since Hawkins does little other than caress the melodies, nothing significant happens, making this one of the most dispensable Coleman Hawkins ever".

Track listing 
 "Out of the Night" (Harry Sosnik, Walter Hirsch) – 2:53
 "Autumn Leaves" (Joseph Kosma, Jacques Prévert, Johnny Mercer) – 2:43
 "Stranger in Paradise" (Robert Wright, George Forrest) – 2:25
 "My Mother's Eyes" (Abel Baer, L. Wolfe Gilbert) – 3:50
 "Everything Happens to Me" (Matt Dennis, Tom Adair) – 2:53
 "It Had to Be You" (Isham Jones, Gus Kahn) – 2:43
 "With Every Breath I Take" (Ralph Rainger, Leo Robin) – 3:14
 "I'm Yours" (Johnny Green, Yip Harburg) – 2:53
 "I Didn't Know What Time It Was" (Richard Rodgers, Lorenz Hart) – 2:51
 "Baubles, Bangles & Beads" (Wright, Forrest) – 2:55
 "Boulevard of Broken Dreams" (Harry Warren, Al Dubin) – 2:31
 "A Cottage for Sale" (Willard Robison, Larry Conley) – 3:09

Personnel 
Coleman Hawkins – tenor saxophone
Unidentified orchestra arranged and conducted by Glenn Osser

References 

Coleman Hawkins albums
1957 albums
Capitol Records albums
Albums arranged by Glenn Osser
Albums conducted by Glenn Osser